Sidney James van den Bergh (25 October 1898 – 25 September 1977) was a Dutch politician of the People's Party for Freedom and Democracy (VVD) and businessman.

Decorations

References

External links

Official
  S.J. (Sidney) van den Bergh Parlement & Politiek
  S.J. van den Bergh (VVD) Eerste Kamer der Staten-Generaal

1898 births
1977 deaths
Businesspeople from Rotterdam
Commanders of the Order of Orange-Nassau
Dutch chief executives in the manufacturing industry
Dutch corporate directors
Dutch nonprofit directors
Dutch people of World War II
Dutch Jews
Dutch people of German-Jewish descent
Erasmus University Rotterdam alumni
Free-thinking Democratic League politicians
Knights of the Order of the Netherlands Lion
Members of the Senate (Netherlands)
Ministers of Defence of the Netherlands
Municipal councillors of Wassenaar
Jewish Dutch politicians
Jewish military personnel
Royal Netherlands Army generals
Military personnel from Rotterdam
Royal Netherlands Army personnel of World War II
Politicians from Rotterdam
People's Party for Freedom and Democracy politicians
Unilever people
20th-century Dutch businesspeople
20th-century Dutch military personnel
20th-century Dutch politicians